Benjamin Cox may refer to:

Benjamin Cox (minister) (fl. 1646), English Baptist minister
Benjamin Cox (sportsman) (born 1975), Australian wheelchair basketball player
Benjamin Franklin Cox, accomplice in the 1981 murder of Michael Donald
Benjamin Elton Cox (born 1931), American civil rights movement activist and preacher